Jean André de Pas de Beaulieu (Montpellier, 14 January 1750 — Port-Louis, 11 August 1783) was a French Navy officer.

Biography 
During the War of American Independence, Beaulieu served in the Indian Ocean in a squadron under Rear-Admiral Thomas d'Estienne d'Orves. On 9 February 1782, Estienne d'Orves died and Suffren assumed command of the squadron. He re-appointed his captains and gave Beaulieu command of the frigate Bellone.

In July 1782, in the wake of the Battle of Negapatam, Suffren transferred Saint-Félix to Artésien and replaced him with Beaulieu.

In January 1783, he was in command of Petit Annibal.

Howerer, Beaulieu commanded Bellone again at the Battle of Trincomalee, while Brillant was under Lieutenant de Kersauson. Beaulieu commanded the 50-gun Petit Annibal at the Battle of Cuddalore.

On 11 August 1783, he married Thérèse Euphrasie Bolgerd in Port-Louis.

Sources and references 
 Notes

References

 Bibliography
 

1750 births
1783 deaths
French Navy officers